John F. Kennedy Memorial Airport  is a city and county-owned public-use airport located two nautical miles (4 km) southwest of the central business district of Ashland, a city in Ashland County, Wisconsin, United States. It is also known as JFK Memorial Airport.

It is included in the Federal Aviation Administration (FAA) National Plan of Integrated Airport Systems for 2021–2025, in which it is categorized as a local general aviation facility.

Facilities and aircraft 
John F. Kennedy Memorial Airport covers an area of 511 acres (207 ha) at an elevation of 827 feet (252 m) above mean sea level. It has two runways with asphalt surfaces: 2/20 is 5,197 by 100 feet (1,584 x 30 m) with approved LOC and GPS approaches and 13/31 is 3,498 by 75 feet (1,066 x 23 m) with approved GPS approaches.

For the 12-month period ending August 23, 2022, the airport had 10,525 aircraft operations, an average of 29 per day: 95% general aviation and 5% air taxi. In January 2023, there were 22 aircraft based at this airport: 20 single-engine, 1 multi-engine and 1 jet.

See also
 List of memorials to John F. Kennedy
 List of airports in Wisconsin

References

External links 
 JFK Memorial Airport at City of Ashland web site
  at Wisconsin DOT Airport Directory
 

Airports in Wisconsin
Buildings and structures in Ashland County, Wisconsin
Airports in Ashland County, Wisconsin
Ashland, Wisconsin
Monuments and memorials to John F. Kennedy in the United States